Roy Phelps is an American former Negro league outfielder who played in the 1940s.

Phelps played for the Birmingham Black Barons in 1945. In four recorded games, he posted two hits in ten plate appearances.

References

External links
 and Seamheads

Year of birth missing
Place of birth missing
Birmingham Black Barons players
Baseball outfielders